Sphecodes mandibularis is a species of sweat bee in the family Halictidae.

References

Further reading

 
 
 

Halictidae
Insects described in 1872